Ronald Haworth (10 March 1901 – October 1973) was an English footballer. His regular position was as a forward. He was born in Lower Darwen, Lancashire. He played for Manchester United, Hull City, and Darwen.

External links
MUFCInfo.com profile

1901 births
1973 deaths
English footballers
Manchester United F.C. players
Hull City A.F.C. players
Association football forwards